Le Vauclin is a commune and town in the French overseas department and region, and island of Martinique.

Geography
Located in the southeast of the island, its neighboring towns are Le François, Saint-Esprit, Rivière-Pilote and Le Marin.

Climate

Le Vauclin has a tropical monsoon climate (Köppen climate classification Am) closely bordering on a tropical savanna climate (Aw).

Population
Its inhabitants are known in French as Vauclinois (masculine) and Vauclinoises (feminine).

History
The dwelling of the Lord of Vauquelin has left its name to the quarter introduced as commune in 1837.

Sports
 Kitesurfing
 Yole

See also
Communes of Martinique

References

External links

Communes of Martinique
Populated places in Martinique